Jacopo Pellegrini (born 12 September 2000) is an Italian professional footballer who plays as a forward for  club Reggiana, on loan from Sassuolo.

Club career
Pellegrini made his professional debut for Sassuolo in a 2–1 Coppa Italia loss to Perugia on 4 December 2019.

On 23 May 2020 he signed his first professional contract for Sassuolo.

On 8 September 2020 he joined Serie C club Gubbio on loan.

On 22 July 2021, he moved to Pordenone in Serie B on a season-long loan.

On 13 July 2022, Pellegrini joined Reggiana on loan.

References

External links
 
 Serie A Profile

2000 births
Sportspeople from Reggio Emilia
Living people
Association football forwards
Italian footballers
U.S. Sassuolo Calcio players
A.S. Gubbio 1910 players
Pordenone Calcio players
A.C. Reggiana 1919 players
Serie C players
Serie B players
Footballers from Emilia-Romagna